Potts Peak is a peak standing at the west side of Eldred Glacier on the north coast of King George Island, South Shetland Islands. Named by the United Kingdom Antarctic Place-Names Committee (UK-APC) in 1960 for Captain Potts, Master of the sealing vessel L.P. Simmons from New London, CT, who visited the South Shetland Islands in 1873–74.

Mountains of King George Island (South Shetland Islands)